John Paul II Bridge may refer to:

 John Paul II Bridge, Puławy, Poland
 Third Millennium John Paul II Bridge, Gdansk, Poland
 Juan Pablo II Bridge, Biobio River, Chile